Giovanni Battista Casali del Drago (30 January 1838 – 17 March 1908) was an Italian cardinal and member of the Italian noble  family. He was a second cousin of the Prince del Drago.

References

Bibliography
Martin Bräuer,  Handbuch der Kardinäle: 1846-2012 (Berlin/Boston: Walter de Gruyter GmbH & Co KG, 2014).

1838 births
1908 deaths
19th-century Italian cardinals
Latin Patriarchs of Constantinople
Cardinals created by Pope Leo XIII
20th-century Italian cardinals
Clergy from Rome